The England women's cricket team toured South Africa in 1960–61, the first women's Test series ever in South Africa.  England won the four match series 1–0, with three drawn Tests.

Test series

1st Test

2nd Test

3rd Test

4th Test

Tour matches

1-day tour match: England Women v Western Province Combined XI Women

2-day tour match: England Women v Western Province Women

2-day tour match: England Women v South African XI Women

2-day tour match: England Women v Southern Transvaal Women

2-day tour match: England Women v South African XI Women

1-day tour match: England Women v Southern Transvaal B Women

2-day tour match: England Women v Natal Women

1-day tour match: England Women v Border Women

1-day single-innings tour match: England Women v Eastern Province Women

References

Women's international cricket tours of South Africa
1960 in English cricket
1960 in South African cricket
1961 in English cricket
1961 in South African cricket
South Africa 1960
Women 1960
International cricket competitions from 1960–61 to 1970
South African cricket seasons from 1945–46 to 1969–70
November 1960 sports events in Africa
December 1960 sports events in Africa
January 1961 sports events in Africa
February 1961 sports events in Africa
1960 in women's cricket
1961 in women's cricket